The BlackBerry Z10 is a high-end LTE touchscreen-based smartphone developed by BlackBerry, previously known as RIM.
The BlackBerry Z10 is the first of two new BlackBerry phones presented at the BlackBerry 10 event on January 30, 2013.  The BlackBerry Z10 was followed by the Z30.

Development
BlackBerry's chief operating officer Kristian Tear and chief marketing officer Frank Boulben fought against co-founder and former co-CEO Mike Lazaridis to have the touchscreen Z10 prioritized over the Q10 which has a physical keyboard.
 
Boublen was then responsible for and received "criticism for the marketing campaign that supported the Z10 launch, including a confusing Super Bowl advertisement which some board members hated".
 
Both Tear and Boublen were ousted on November 25, 2013 by new CEO John S. Chen, whom weeks earlier had replaced Thorsten Heins.

Software

The BlackBerry Z10 uses the new BlackBerry 10 (Currently running on 10.3.3) mobile operating system based on QNX. The user interface of BB 10 is based on the concept of direct manipulation, using multi-touch gestures. Interaction with the OS includes a range of multi-touch gestures, all of which have specific definitions within the context of the BB10 operating system and its multi-touch interface. The Z10 comes pre-loaded with a variety of default BlackBerry applications.

The phone has a mobile hotspot functionality, which supports up to 8 devices, sharing its internet connection. It accesses the BlackBerry World, an online application distribution platform for the BlackBerry OS. The service allows users to browse and download applications, games, music, videos from the BlackBerry World store. Additionally, the touchscreen keyboard learns the user's writing style and suggests words to help the user type faster.

The BlackBerry Z10 has an 8-megapixel rear-facing camera, as well as a 2-megapixel front-facing camera. Its camera software includes a burst mode branded as "TimeShift".

The Z10 has voice control, that allows the user to operate the phone by spoken commands. This can be used to send messages, compose emails, dictate documents, and search the phone just by speaking to the app.

Hardware
There are four SKUs for the Blackberry Z10, corresponding to the North American carrier band distribution and international versions. The LTE version of the Z10 features the Qualcomm Snapdragon S4 Plus (SoC) which has a dual-core CPU running at 1.5 GHz, and an Adreno 225 GPU for LTE-capable units. For markets where LTE is not supported (international model), BlackBerry released the Z10 with the Texas Instruments OMAP 4470 (SoC) which has a dual-core CPU running at 1.5 GHz and a PowerVR SGX 544 GPU. It will use STE M5730 modem.

Z10 follow all the slate phone design, with the outer housing of the frame is made of plastic combined with an internal stainless steel metal frame, while the back cover was made of plastic and protected by rubber finish. The on/off and volume button were made of metal.

It is available in 2 color variant, which is black and white. A limited red edition was available for qualified app developers.

Availability

In Canada, the BlackBerry Z10 was available at Bell Mobility (including Virgin Mobile Canada), Mobilicity, Rogers Wireless (including Fido), SaskTel, Telus Mobility (including Koodo Mobile), Wind Mobile, and Vidéotron Mobile. It went on sale February 5, 2013. MTS mobility started a presale for the Z10 with an unknown launch date for the phone. Eastlink has also released the Z10.

In South Africa the Z10 became available on February 22, 2013 on MTN. Vodacom had announced their intention to make the Z10 available, the day before on 21st Feb 2013.

In Nigeria, the Z10 became available on March 1, 2013 on carriers Etisalat, Glo, Airtel and MTN Nigeria.

Claro República Dominicana announced pre-order date of March 7 on Facebook and sale on March 14 in the Dominican Republic. Orange Dominicana also announced pre-order of March 7 with a launch of March 14 on their Facebook page.

On February 10, 2013, prepaid provider and T-Mobile US-MVNO Solavei became the first in the United States to offer the BlackBerry Z10. In March 2013, T-Mobile USA announced that the Z10 would be available for business pre-order on March 11, with pick-up on March 13. The store wide launch was scheduled for March 27. On March 11, AT&T announced a March 22 release date for the device, with pre-orders beginning March 12. Verizon announced pre-ordered for March 14, with a release date of March 28.

Mexican Telcel announced pre-orders for Z10 on March 21 on Facebook and finally released on April 2.

In Australia, major telcos Optus and Telstra announced their intention to stock on March 25 and March 26 respectively.

In New Zealand, Vodafone NZ made the BlackBerry Z10 available for sale on June 18, 2013.

In India, the Z10 was launched on February 25, 2013.

In Taiwan, Taiwan Mobile announced that Blackberry Z10 is available on 15 April 2013.

Model comparison

See also 
BlackBerry 10
List of BlackBerry 10 devices

References

External links
 

Z10
Mobile phones introduced in 2013
Discontinued smartphones